The Narrowing Circle is a 1954 mystery crime novel by the British writer Julian Symons. The title refers to the "narrowing circle" the investigating policemen throw around the most likely suspect.

Synopsis
An ambitious young man working for a magazine expects promotion, but is passed over for one of his colleagues. When, within twenty four hours the colleague turns up dead, he becomes the prime suspect for the murder.

Film adaptation
In 1956 it was made into a British film of the same title directed by Charles Saunders and starring Paul Carpenter, Hazel Court and Russell Napier.

References

Bibliography
 Goble, Alan. The Complete Index to Literary Sources in Film. Walter de Gruyter, 1999.
 Reilly, John M. Twentieth Century Crime & Mystery Writers. Springer, 2015.
 Walsdorf, John J. & Allen, Bonnie J. Julian Symons: A Bibliography. Oak Knoll Press, 1996.

1954 British novels
Novels by Julian Symons
British detective novels
British crime novels
British mystery novels
Novels set in London
British novels adapted into films
Victor Gollancz Ltd books